Wanda Hamidah (born 21 September 1977) is an Indonesian politician, actress and activist. She was a member of the Jakarta Regional People's Representative Council between 2009 and 2014.

Early life and education
Wanda Hamidah was born in Jakarta on 21 September 1977. She also took a masters of notary at the University of Indonesia.

Career
Wanda began her career as a model, and she was one for around 12 years. Between 2000 and 2002, she was a news presenter at MetroTV. She participated in the student demonstrations of 1998 and joined the newly formed National Mandate Party (PAN) that year. According to Wanda, she was wanted for being part of the student demonstrations and she had witnessed the Trisakti shootings directly.

In 2009, she was elected into Jakarta's regional legislative body and was sworn in on 25 August. Wanda stated then that she wanted to run for the national People's Representative Council, but intended to learn at Jakarta's legislative council first.

During her time in the legislative body, she also featured in her first movie Pengejar Angin in 2011. She was also a commissioner in the National Commission of Child Protection (Komnas PA). She also had worked as a notary, operating her own office.

In 2014, she was fired from PAN due to her support of Joko Widodo in the 2014 Indonesian presidential election - while PAN supported Prabowo Subianto. After the expiry of her tenure in the DPRD, she became a critic of the body, citing excessive lobbying and opposing a proposal to revert direct gubernatorial elections to the DPRD. She later joined the Nasdem Party, where she became the chairman of the party's Jakarta's branch. In the 2019 Indonesian legislative election, she ran for a seat in Jakarta's 1st electoral district (East Jakarta), but she failed to win a seat.

Personal life
She was married to Cyril Raoul Hakim, having five children before their divorce, and she later remarried Daniel Patrick Hadi Schuldt with whom she had her sixth child.

Filmography
 Pengejar Angin (2011)
 Cahaya Dari Timur: Beta Maluku (2014)
 Dear Love (2016)

References

1977 births
Living people
Actresses from Jakarta
Politicians from Jakarta
Nasdem Party politicians
University of Indonesia alumni
Trisakti University alumni
Jakarta Regional People's Representative Council members
Indonesian television presenters
Indonesian women television presenters